Lee Jae-Cheol  (born 25 December 1975) is a South Korean former footballer who played as a defender for Suwon Samsung Bluewings in the K League. He also played for Hummel FC in Korea National League. In the 2013 season, he was manager of Chungju Hummel FC, but he was outed due to bad results.

References

External links 
 

1975 births
Living people
South Korean footballers
Suwon Samsung Bluewings players
Chungju Hummel FC players
K League 1 players
Korea National League players
Chungju Hummel FC managers
Sportspeople from Incheon
Association football defenders
South Korean football managers